Onmeetbarediepgat is one of the major caves in the Quaternary limestone formations in the district of Bredasdorp in the Western Cape Province of South Africa. The name in Afrikaans means "Immeasurably deep hole". The cave system is expressed at the surface as a sinkhole about 50 m wide and 20 m deep. The bottom is covered with limestone rubble. A small hole leads into a substantial cave system, which has been explored since the 1950s, mainly by the South African Spelaeological Association (SASA). Entry to distant parts of the cave is hindered by sumps.

Caves of South Africa
Landforms of the Western Cape